Jamón (pl. jamones) is a kind of dry-cured ham produced in Spain. It is one of the most globally recognized food items of Spanish cuisine. It is also regularly a component of tapas.

Most jamón is commonly called jamón serrano in Spain.

Jamón is the Spanish word for ham. As such, other ham products produced or consumed in Spanish-speaking countries may also be called by this name.

Description
Jamón is typically consumed in slices, either manually carved from a pig's hind leg held on a jamonero stand using a sharp thin slicing knife, or cut from the deboned meat with a rotatory cold-cut slicer. It's also regularly consumed in any shape in small portions.

As a product, Jamón is similar to Portuguese presunto and to Italian prosciutto, but the production differs by a longer curing phase (up to 18 months), giving it a dryer texture, deeper color and stronger flavour than the former.

A whole Jamón leg is considerably cheaper by weight than its sliced counterpart because it includes the bone and non-edible fat. Once the external fat layers are removed and the meat is exposed, though, the product must be consumed as soon as possible since a progressive drying and deteriorating process starts. This is not an issue for restaurateurs and retailers, since they go through product much faster than an individual. Home users will typically choose sliced product, be it freshly cut from a deli stand, commercially pre-packaged or vacuum preserved. Jamón is safe to consume for as long as the leg is kept in a dry and cool environment and out of direct sunlight, but it must be kept refrigerated once cut away from the leg.

Jamón may also be smoked in some regions, where it is used mostly for personal consumption. This form of ham is common in the southern areas of Castile and León as well as in parts of Extremadura. Such a jamón has a harder texture and a smoky-salty flavour.

Though widely available in Spain (even if on the expensive side) and accessible in some countries of the European Union, import duties and trade or food safety restrictions applied to foreign meat products in international markets may raise prices substantially while creating scarcity, often making jamón a prohibitively expensive product for other countries to import.

There are two main commercial labels for jamón, based on the pig breed and protected designations:

 Jamón ibérico, is made from the black Iberian pig, and may be consumed internationally as a delicacy
 Jamón serrano (meaning "sierra ham"), includes most other varieties

Jamón serrano 
The term jamón serrano ("serrano ham", ham from the sierra, or mountain range) is regularly applied as an umbrella culinary term for all dry-cured jamón produced in Spain, as opposed to jamón de York, which is cooked whole on the bone.

It is most precisely applied, though, to jamón produced from white and/or non-Ibérico breeds of pig. This is the most commonly produced and consumed range of jamón in Spain. The majority of jamones serranos are produced from a landrace breed of white pigs or from commercial breeds such as Duroc. Jamón serrano, described variously as jamón reserva, jamón curado, and jamón extra or any generic jamón nomenclature, is produced from compound-fed white pigs.

Jamón serrano has TSG (Traditional Speciality Guaranteed) status in the EU and the UK. The TSG certification attests that a particular food product objectively possesses specific characteristics that differentiate it from all others in its category and that its raw materials, composition, or method of production have been consistent for a minimum of 30 years.

Production 
Fresh hams are trimmed and cleaned, then stacked and covered with salt for about two weeks to draw off excess moisture and preserve the meat from spoiling. The salt is then washed off, and the hams are hung to dry for about six months. Finally, the hams are hung in a cool, dry place for six to 18 months, depending on the climate, as well as the size and type of ham being cured. The drying sheds (secaderos) are usually built at higher elevations, which is why the ham is called “mountain ham”.

Jamón ibérico 

Pork products made from Iberian-breed pigs receive the ibérico/a denomination. As such, jamón ibérico is the dry-cured jamón produced from livestock of these breeds. Ibérico encompasses some of the most expensive ham produced in the world, and its fatty marbled texture has made it very popular as a delicacy, with a hard to fulfill global demand comparable to that of kobe beef.

Since jamón ibérico production and export is limited, buyer should beware and not fall victim of bait-and-switch or quality fraud similar to that of olive oil, since it has been estimated that a sizable portion of both local market and exports are not actually ibérico. Spain regulation defines trade labeling for all ibérico products.

European Union protected designation of origin 

Under the Common Agricultural Policy of the European Union (EU), certain well-established meat products, including some local jamón and jamón producers, are covered by a protected designation of origin (PDO) or protected geographical indication (PGI):

 Jamón de Teruel has PDO status.
 Jamón de Los Pedroches has PDO status.
 Jamón Dehesa de Extremadura has PDO status.
 Jamón de Guijuelo has PDO status.
 Jamón de Huelva has PDO status.
 Jamón de Trevélez has PGI status.

Paleta
The paleta de cerdo or paletilla is a product similar to jamón; it is made from the front leg of a pig, instead of the hind leg used for jamón, cured using the same process and consumed in the same way. Since whole legs are sold by weight and paletillas are lighter, they are often marketed towards home consumption.

A paletilla may be described or marketed as Ibérica when produced from the same livestock as Jamón Ibérico.

See also

 Curing (food preservation)
 Ham
 Lacón Gallego
 
 List of dried foods
 Spanish cuisine

References

Ham
Spanish cuisine